Valeria Alessandrini (born 26 August 1975) is an Italian politician.

Political career 
Alessandrini was elected in 2020 in a by-election to succeed Donatella Tesei.

References 

Living people
1975 births
Senators of Legislature XVIII of Italy
Lega Nord politicians
People from Terni
21st-century Italian politicians
21st-century Italian women politicians
20th-century Italian women
Women members of the Senate of the Republic (Italy)